Live Tour 85 is the first live album by French rocker Alain Bashung, issued in 1985 on Philips Records.

Production 
The album was first issued as a single vinyl album, but was quickly rereleased as a double album at Bashung's request (with a studio cover of "Hey Joe" added at the end).

Reception

Critical reception 
In 2010, the French edition of Rolling Stone magazine named this album the 16th greatest French rock album (out of 100).

Track listing

Personnel 
 Alain Bashung - vocals, guitar
 Frantz Delage - bass guitar
 Philippe Draï - drums, drum machine
 Oli Guindon - guitar
 Richard Mortier - rhythm guitar
 Christian Tourines - synthesizers, saxophone
 Paul Personne - guitar (5)
Technical
 S. Van Poucke - graphs back cover & photos
 Huart/Cholley - graphs
 Nick Patrick - production, mixing
 Christian Ramon - mixing (1 to 11)
 Clive Martin - mixing (12 to 15)

References 

1985 live albums
Barclay (record label) albums
Alain Bashung albums